Marco Antonio Gama Basarte (born 18 October 1970) is a Mexican politician affiliated with the National Action Party. He served as Deputy of the LIX Legislature of the Mexican Congress representing San Luis Potosí, and previously served in the LV Legislature of the Congress of San Luis Potosí.

References

1970 births
Living people
Politicians from San Luis Potosí
National Action Party (Mexico) politicians
Autonomous University of San Luis Potosi alumni
Members of the Congress of San Luis Potosí
20th-century Mexican politicians
21st-century Mexican politicians
Deputies of the LIX Legislature of Mexico
Members of the Chamber of Deputies (Mexico) for San Luis Potosí